Guy Hibbert is a British screenwriter and playwright.

He has won four BAFTA TV awards, including Best Writer for the 2009 film Five Minutes of Heaven. This film was premiered at the 25th Sundance Film Festival, where Hibbert won the World Cinema Screenwriting Award.

Five Minutes of Heaven also won the Christopher Ewart-Biggs Memorial Prize, given for work promoting peace and reconciliation in Ireland. 

His script for Eye In The Sky won Best Screenplay at Evening Standard British Film Awards 2017. 

Hibbert started his writing career as a playwright. His play On The Edge was the winner of the John Whiting Award in 1985.  

Other awards include the Mental Health Media Award in 1998 and in 2004 and the Joan Coleman Award in 2013 for his contribution to the understanding of mental health. 

Hibbert lives in London with his wife, poet and translator Meifu Wang. He has one daughter, Celeste.

Filmography
 Master of the Marionettes (1989) writer 
 Aimee (1991) – writer
 Bad Girl (1992) – writer
 Nice Town (1992) – writer
 Saigon Baby (1995) – writer
 Prime Suspect - "Scent of Darkness" (1997) – writer
 No Child Of Mine (1997) – writer 
 Shot Through the Heart (1998) – writer
 The Russian Bride (2001) - writer and executive producer
 May 33rd (2004) – writer and executive producer
 Omagh (2004) – co-writer with Paul Greengrass
 Who Gets the Dog? (2007) – writer 
 Five Minutes of Heaven (2009) – writer
 Blood and Oil (2010) – writer
 Complicit (2013) – writer and executive producer
 One Child (2014) - writer and executive producer
 Eye in the Sky (2015) – writer and executive producer
 A United Kingdom (2016) - writer and executive producer

References

External links

1950 births
Living people
British male screenwriters
Sundance Film Festival award winners
Christopher Ewart-Biggs Memorial Prize recipients
writers from Oxford